Charles Albert Lyons (13 August 1929 – 1 January 2008) was General Secretary of the Transport Salaried Staffs' Association (TSSA) and a member of the General Council of the Trades Unions Congress.

Railway career

In 1950 Bert started working for British Rail, and joined the Labour Party and the Railway Clerks' Association (which a year later became the TSSA).

He became a full-time organiser for the TSSA in 1959, being appointed Scottish Secretary in 1965 and then LM Line Secretary in 1968. In 1977 Lyons was senior assistant general secretary.

TSSA General Secretary

Following Tom Jenkins' retirement in 1982, Lyons was elected TSSA General Secretary, a position he retained until 1989.

References

External links
Obituary in TSSA Journal
Single or Return - the official history of the Transport Salaried Staffs' Association

Members of the General Council of the Trades Union Congress
General Secretaries of the Transport Salaried Staffs' Association
1929 births
2008 deaths